Cambodian Canadians are Canadians of Cambodian ethnic origin or descent. There are a total of 38,490 Canadian Cambodians, most of whom reside in Toronto and Montreal.

Aside from their primary language of Khmer, many Cambodians are known to also speak French and English. Buddhism, Catholicism   and Christianity are common religions among Cambodian-Canadians.

History 
During the Cambodian genocide of 1975-1979, nearly two million Cambodians were enslaved and forced into concentration camps under the tyranny of the Khmer Rouge regime, by which they were brutally tortured, massacred, and discriminated against at large. The tragedies and destruction from this period resulted in a large wave of Cambodian refugees, most of whom migrated to Canada, the U.S., France and Australia. In 1981, there were 13,000 Cambodian-Canadian Refugees, with most of the population settling into major cities such as Montreal, Toronto, Ottawa, Calgary, Edmonton and Quebec City. The Jane and Finch neighborhood of Toronto boasts a visible Cambodian population, in which they make up about 4% of the community. By 2016, the number of Cambodians in Canada had risen to 38,490.

Religion 
Cambodians are generally known as advocates of Buddhism, following a syncretic blend of Buddhist traditions and the teachings of various ethnic religions. The Cambodian communities of Canada annually celebrate their New Year in April, and Ancestors' Day in October. Other notable celebrations include Victory Day and those revolving around Cambodian arts and music.

The festival of Ancestors' Day, or "Pchum Ben", is the remembrance of the deceased. On this day is when Cambodians pay their respects to deceased relatives and ancestors.

Organizations 
In 1979, elder members of the Cambodian-Canadian community established the CCAO (Cambodian-Canadian Association of Ontario); other community organizations of Cambodian foundation include the Khmer Buddhist Group.

Demographics

Notable people
Honey Cocaine, rapper
Ellen Wong, actress
Patricia Hy-Boulais, former tennis player

See also

Cambodians in the Greater Toronto Area

References 

 
Ethnic groups in Canada